Hans Wentorf (6 April 1899 – 1 January 1970) was a German international footballer. He was part of Germany's team at the 1928 Summer Olympics, but he did not play in any matches.

References

1899 births
1970 deaths
Association football goalkeepers
German footballers
Germany international footballers
Olympic footballers of Germany
Footballers at the 1928 Summer Olympics